The 1983 Galerie Dominique Artists season was the ninth and final season of the franchise in the Philippine Basketball Association (PBA).

Transactions

Occurrences
Days before the start of the four-team quarterfinal round in the Open Conference, Galerie Dominique team owner and manager Nikki Coseteng formally asked the PBA for some assistance to be able to play in the quarterfinals. It was reported the team was not paying the salaries of imports Larry Fogle and Don Robinson, who both threatened not to play. Galerie Dominique was on the verge of a financial collapse and the PBA earlier had second thoughts of aiding the embattled ballclub. But in a last-minute, the PBA board voted in favor of giving financial assistance to the beleaguered ballclub, thus Fogle and Robinson were able to play for the Artists.

Won-loss records vs Opponents

Roster

 Team Manager: Nikki Coseteng

References

Galerie Dominique Artists
Galerie